Ihering's antwren (Myrmotherula iheringi) is a species of bird in the family Thamnophilidae. It is found in the western Amazon basin of Brazil, Peru and far northwestern Bolivia.

Its natural habitat is subtropical or tropical moist lowland forests.

Named after Hermann von Ihering.

References

Ihering's antwren
Birds of the Bolivian Amazon
Birds of the Brazilian Amazon
Birds of the Peruvian Amazon
Ihering's antwren
Ihering's antwren
Taxonomy articles created by Polbot